Saved by Love is a 1908 silent film short directed by Edwin S. Porter and produced by the Edison Manufacturing Company. It featured the screen debut of actress Miriam Nesbitt.

Cast
Florence Turner 
Pat O'Malley 
Walter Edwin
Miriam Nesbitt

References

External links
Saved by Love at IMDb.com

1908 films
1908 short films
American silent short films
Films directed by Edwin S. Porter
Edison Manufacturing Company films
American black-and-white films
1900s American films